Fire Deuce is a band created as a side-project by Travis Stever, the lead guitarist of Coheed and Cambria. The band features members of other bands, such as Joey Eppard, Billy Riker, Chris Gartmann, and Joe Stote from the band 3, Claudio Sanchez from the band Coheed and Cambria, and Josh Eppard (rapper Weerd Science and drummer of Coheed and Cambria).

The 80's style metal group released their debut EP "Children Of The Deuce" on May 10, 2005, on CI Records. In an interview with Alternative Press in 2005, Travis Stever said that "three of the songs were fueled by Southern Comfort... and one by vodka".

A description on the official Fire Deuce website describes their style as:" elements of Coheed and Cambria's unique style alongside the hard-rock influence of bands such as AC/DC and Guns N' Roses, the raw energy of The Stooges, and the rocking punk riffage of Turbonegro, to create a brilliant, must-have record any Coheed and Cambria fan will love..." "...Fire Deuce, can easily be considered the new Spinal Tap, or, at the very least, The Darkness done right. All of these details combine to ensure that Fire Deuce stand to take their place as the masters of over-the-top, tongue-in-cheek, hard rock."

Band members

Discography

External links
 MySpace (official website)
 CI Records - Band's Profile Page
 CI Records - Record Label Home Page

American heavy metal musical groups